Aïn El Kerma is a town and commune in Oran Province, Algeria.

References

Communes of Oran Province